Ornithopus pinnatus, the  orange birdsfoot, is a plant in the Fabaceae family. It was first described as Scorpiurus pinnata in 1768 by Philip Miller in The Gardeners Dictionary. In 1907, George Claridge Druce assigned it to the genus Ornithopus. 

It is native to Western Europe, the Mediterranean Region and Macaronesia but is found elsewhere as an introduced species.

References

External links
Ornithopus pinnatus images and occurrence data from GBIF

Taxa named by Philip Miller
Flora of Europe
Plants described in 1768
Loteae